Bora  is a common masculine Turkish given name. See Bora (wind).

People

Given name
 Bora Aksu, London-based Turkish fashion designer
 Bora Dağtekin, award-winning German author and screen writer of Turkish descent
 Bora Körk, Turkish footballer

Surname
 Ekrem Bora, a Turkish actor.

Turkish-language surnames
Turkish masculine given names